Puthuppally State assembly constituency is one of the 140 state legislative assembly constituencies in Kerala state in southern India. It is also one of the seven state legislative assembly constituencies included in the Kottayam Lok Sabha constituency. As of the 2021 assembly elections, the current MLA is Oommen Chandy of Indian National Congress.

Local self governed segments
Puthuppally Niyamasabha constituency is composed of the following local self governed segments:

{ "type": "ExternalData",  "service": "geoshape",  "ids": "Q16133577,Q13110092,Q20576926,Q20582342,Q13114100,Q16133919,Q13113324,Q13114624"}

Members of Legislative Assembly
The following list contains all members of Kerala legislative assembly who have represented Puthuppally Niyamasabha Constituency during the period of various assemblies:

Key

Election results
Percentage change (±%) denotes the change in the number of votes from the immediate previous election.

Niyamasabha Election 2021
There were 1,75,959 registered voters in Puthuppally Constituency for the 2021 Kerala Niyamasabha Election.

Partywise Results 

}}

Niyamasabha Election 2016
There were 1,73,253 registered voters in Puthuppally Constituency for the 2016 Kerala Niyamasabha Election.

Partywise Results

Niyamasabha Election 2011 
There were 1,57,222 registered voters in the constituency for the 2011 election.

See also
 Puthuppally
 Kottayam district
 List of constituencies of the Kerala Legislative Assembly
 2016 Kerala Legislative Assembly election
1970 
Ommen Chandy  Indian national Congress  50067
EM George  Communist  Party  of  India  49000
KG.Marar Bharti ya janatha party  1098

References

Assembly constituencies of Kerala

State assembly constituencies in Kottayam district